Nationality words link to articles with information on the nation's poetry or literature (for instance, Irish or France).

Events

 January 23 — English poet Robert Graves marries the painter Nancy Nicholson in London. Wedding guests include Wilfred Owen, who will be killed by the end of the year, and whose first nationally published poem appears 3 days later ("Miners" in The Nation).
 April — Hu Shih, chief advocate of the revolution in Chinese literature at this time, publishes an essay, "Constructive Literary Revolution - A Literature of National Speech" in New Youth proposing a four-point reform program.
 June — English poet Basil Bunting is imprisoned as a conscientious objector.
 August 17 — English poets Wilfred Owen and Siegfried Sassoon meet for the last time, in London, and spend what Sassoon later describes as "the whole of a hot cloudless afternoon together."
 November 4 — English war poet Wilfred Owen is killed in action, aged 25, at the Sambre–Oise Canal with only five of his poems published. News of his death reaches his parents in Oswestry a week later on Armistice Day.
—Closing line of "Anthem for Doomed Youth" by Wilfred Owen
 December — The Poems of Gerard Manley Hopkins (d. 1889; including The Wreck of the Deutschland, 1875/6) are published by his friend Robert Bridges; few were published in Hopkins's lifetime, so this presents his innovative sprung rhythm and imagery to many readers for the first time.

Works published

Canada
 Marie Joussaye, Selections from Anglo-Saxon Songs.
 Wilson MacDonald, The Song Of The Prairie Land and Other Poems. Albert E. S. Smythe intr., Toronto: McClelland & Stewart.

India in English
 The Bengali Writers of English Verse: A Record and an Appreciation, Calcutta: Thacker, Spink U Co., 1918.; London: Longmans, Green and Co., 119 pages; anthology; Indian poetry in English, published in the United Kingdom
 Harindranath Chattopadhyaya, The Feast of Youth, Madras: Theosophical Publishing House; India, Indian poetry in English
 Baldoon Dhingra, Symphony of Love, Cambridge: Bowes and Bowes; Indian poet, writing in English, published in the United Kingdom
 Theodore Douglas Dunn, editor, The Bengali Book of English Verse, Bombay: Longmans, Green and Co.; anthology; Indian poetry in English

United Kingdom
 Marian Allen, The Wind on the Downs
 Laurence Binyon, The New World: Poems
 Vera Brittain, Verses of a VAD
 Rupert Brooke (died on active service 1915), The Collected Poems of Rupert Brooke
 Émile Cammaerts, Messines and other Poems, Belgian-born poet writing in English
 Walter de la Mare, Motley, and Other Poems
 Baldoon Dhingra, Symphony of Love, Cambridge: Bowes and Bowes; Indian poet, writing in English, published in the United Kingdom
 Eleanor Farjeon, Sonnets and Poems
 Wilfrid Gibson, Whin
 Oliver St. John Gogarty, The Ship, and Other Poems
 Helen Hamilton, Napoo!
 A. P. Herbert, The Bomber Gipsy, and Other Poems
 Gerard Manley Hopkins (died 1889), Poems of Gerard Manley Hopkins
 C. Morton Horne ("killed in action January 27, 1916"), Songs of the Shrapnel Shell, and Other Verse, Irish poet published simultaneously in the United States and United Kingdom
 Ford Madox Hueffer, On Heaven, and Poems written on active service
 Aldous Huxley, The Defeat of Youth, and Other Poems
 Geoffrey Studdert Kennedy, Rough Rhymes of a Padre
 D. H. Lawrence, New Poems
Bertram Lloyd, ed., Poems Written During the Great War, 1914–1918
 Ewart Alan Mackintosh (killed in action 1917), War, The Liberator, and Other Pieces, Scottish poet
 Susan Miles, Dunch
 Margaret Postgate, Margaret Postgate's Poems
 Morley Roberts, War Lyrics
 Siegfried Sassoon, Counter-Attack and Other Poems
 Fredegond Shove, Dreams and Journeys
 Dora Sigerson (died January 6), The Sad Years and Other Poems, Irish poet resident in London
 Edith Sitwell, Clowns' Houses
 Sacheverell Sitwell, The People's Palace
 Geoffrey Bache Smith (died of wounds 1916), A Spring Harvest (edited with preface by J. R. R. Tolkien)
 J. C. Squire, Poems, First Series
 Edward Thomas (killed in action April 9), Last Poems
 Katharine Tynan, Herb o' Grace, poems in war-time
 Arthur Waley, editor and translator, One Hundred and Seventy Chinese Poems, anthology
 W. B. Yeats, Nine Poems, Irish poet published in the United Kingdom

United States
 Conrad Aiken, The Charnel Rose, Senlin: A Biography, and Other Poems
 Sherwood Anderson, Mid-American Chants
 Stephen Vincent Benet, Young Adventure
 John Gould Fletcher, The Tree of Life
 Amy Lowell, Can Grande's Castle
 Edgar Lee Masters, Toward the Gulf
 Charles Reznikoff, Rhythms, his first book of poetry, a small volume, self-published
 Lola Ridge, The Ghetto and Other Poems
 Carl Sandburg, Cornhuskers, Holt, Rinehart and Winston
 Wallace Stevens, "Le Monocle de Mon Oncle" is first published (it will later be included in his first poetry book, Harmonium.

Other in English
 C. J. Dennis, Australia:
 Digger Smith
 Backblock Ballads and Later Verses
 Fernando Pessoa, Portuguese poet writing in English published in Portugal
 Antinous
 35 Sonnets
 W. B. Yeats, Nine Poems, Irish poet published in the United Kingdom

Works published in other languages

France
 Guillaume Apollinaire, pen name of Wilhelm Apollinaris de Kostrowitzky, Calligrammes, France
 Jean Cocteau, Le Cap de Bonne Espérance, about the author's experience as a trapeze artist, written in vers brisés
 Henri de Régnier, 1914–1916: poésies
 Max Jacob, Le Cornet à Dès
 Oscar Vladislas de Lubicz-Milosz, also known as O. V. de L. Milosz, Adramandoni
 Pierre Reverdy,
 Les Ardoises du toit
 Les Jockeys camouflés
 Tristan Tzara, pen name of Sami Rosenstock, Vingt-cinq poèmes

Germany
 Kurd Adler, Wiederkehr: Gedichte
 Wilhelm Runge, Das Denken träumt

Spanish language
 Gerardo Diego, El romancero de la novia ("The Bride's Ballads"), Spain
 Federico García Lorca, Impressiones y paisajes ("Impressions and Landscapes"), Spain
 César Vallejo, Los heraldos negros ("The Black Heralds" ) the author's first book is "a bitter interpretation of provincial life" which "represented a break with symbolism and had a profound effect upon contemporary poetry in Peru

Other languages
 Deva Kanta Barua, Sagar dekhisa, Indian, Assamese language
 Aleksandr Blok, The Twelve (Russian: Двенадцать, Dvenadtsat), a controversial long poem, one of the first poetic responses to Russia's 1917  October Revolution
 António Botto, Cantigas de Saudade, Portugal
 Miloš Crnjanski, Лирика Итаке ("Lyrics of Ithaca"), Serbian Cyrillic
 Aaro Hellaakoski, Nimettömiä lauluja, Finland
 Sh-Y. Imber, ed. Inter arma: a zamlung lirik (Inter Arma: a collection of lyrics), Galician Yiddish, Austria
 Sir Muhammad Iqbal, Rumuz-e-Bekhudi (The Secrets of Selflessness)  published in Persian, his second philosophical poetry book
 Augusta Peaux, Gedichten, Netherlands
 Pavlo Tychyna, Clarinets of the Sun , Ukraine

Births

Death years link to the corresponding "[year] in poetry" article:
 February 1 – Muriel Spark (died 2006), Scottish novelist and poet
 February 17 – William Bronk (died 1999), American poet
 April 15 – Louis Coxe (died 1993), American poet
 April 23 – James Kirkup (died 2009), English poet, translator and travel writer
 May 10 – Jane Mayhall (died 2009), American poet and novelist
 May 21 – Gopal Prasad Rimal (died 1973), Indian, Nepali-language poet and playwright
 July 9 – John Heath-Stubbs (died 2006), English poet and translator
 August 23 – Vinda Karandikar, also known as C. V. Karandikar (died 2010), Indian, Marathi-language poet, critic and translator
 August 31 – Shimizu Motoyoshi 清水基吉 (died 2008), Japanese Shōwa and Heisei period novelist and poet (surname: Shimizu)
 September 30 – Gevorg Emin Գևորգ Էմին (died 1998), Armenian
 November 14 – Valentin Iremonger (died 1991), Irish poet and diplomat
 November 16 – Nicholas Moore (died 1986), English poet, associated with the New Apocalyptics in the 1940s, who later drops out of the literary world
 November 18 – İlhan Berk (died 2008), Turkish poet
 November 19 – W. S. Graham (died 1986), Scottish poet often associated with Dylan Thomas and the neo-romantic poets
 December 8 – Hans Børli (died 1989), Norwegian poet, novelist and writer
 December 30 – Al Purdy (died 2000), popular Canadian poet
Also:
 M. Gopalakrishna Adiga (died 1992), Indian, Kannada-language poet often said to be the pioneer of the "navya" (modernist) literary movement in Karnataka
 Indra Dev Bhojvani, also known as "Indur", Indian, Sindhi-language
 Ram Narain Singh Dardi, Indian, Punjabi-language poet who wrote in the Lahndi dialect
 Siddayya Puranika, Indian, Kannada-language poet
 Amritdhari Singha, Indian, Maithili-language writer, philosopher and poet

Deaths

Note two subsections, below. Birth years link to the corresponding "[year] in poetry" article:
 January 1 – Wilfred Campbell (born c.1860), Canadian poet
 January 6 – Dora Sigerson (born 1866), Irish poet
 June 10 – Arrigo Boito (born 1842), Italian poet, journalist, novelist and composer
 June 26 – Peter Rosegger (born 1843), Austrian poet
 September 18 – Saul Adadi (born 1850), Libyan Sephardi Jewish hakham, rosh yeshiva and writer of piyyutim
 September 21 — Emily Julian McManus (born 1865), Canadian poet, author, and educator
 October 12 – Mary Hannay Foott (born 1846), Australian poet
 c. November (probable date) – Arthur Cravan (born 1887), Swiss-born Francophone literary editor, poet and boxer, presumed lost at sea
 December 23 – Thérèse Schwartze (born 1851), Dutch portrait painter and poet
 Also:
 A. R. Raja Raja Varma (born 1863), Indian, Malayalam-language poet, grammarian, scholar, critic and writer; nephew of Kerala Varma Valiya Koil Thampuran
 Balakavi, pen name of Tryambak Bapuji Thomare (born 1890), Indian, Marathi-language poet; died in a train accident
 Gobinda Rath (born 1848), Indian, Oriya-language poet and satirist
 Govind Vasudev Kanitkar (born 1854), Indian, Marathi-language poet and translator

Killed in World War I

 January 28 – John McCrae (born 1872), Canadian poet, author of "In Flanders Fields" and lieutenant colonel serving as a field surgeon in the war, from pneumonia
 April 1 – Isaac Rosenberg (born 1890), English war poet, killed in Fampoux in the Somme at dawn (there is a dispute as to whether his death occurred at the hands of a sniper or in close combat); first buried in a mass grave, but in 1926, his remains are identified and reinterred at Bailleul Road East Cemetery Plot V, St. Laurent-Blangy, Pas de Calais, France
 July 30 – Joyce Kilmer (born 1886), American, killed in Second Battle of the Marne in France after volunteering to join Major William "Wild Bill" Donovan's First Battalion to lead the day's attack; while scouting, Kilmer is shot in the head near the village of Seringes; posthumously awarded the Croix de Guerre
 November 4 – Wilfred Owen (born 1893), English war poet, killed in action in France (see Events above)
 John Munro (Iain Rothach) (born 1889), Scottish Gaelic poet, killed serving with the Seaforth Highlanders
 See also Guillaume Apollinaire below

Died in the 1918 flu pandemic
 October 21 – E. J. Luce (born 1881), Jèrriais poet and journalist
 November 9 – Guillaume Apollinaire (born 1880), French language poet, writer and art critic credited with coining the word surrealism, dies two years after being wounded in World War I and still vulnerable from his injury
 December 2 – Edmond Rostand (born 1868), French poet and dramatist

Awards and honors
 Pulitzer Prize for Poetry: Sara Teasdale: Love Songs

See also

 List of years in poetry
 Dada
 Imaginism movement in Russian poetry
 Modernist poetry in English
 Silver Age of Russian Poetry
 Young Poland (Polish: Młoda Polska) modernist period in Polish  arts and literature
 Poetry

Notes

Poetry
20th-century poetry